The 2014 Howard Bison football team represented Howard University in the 2014 NCAA Division I FCS football season. They were led by third year head coach Gary Harrell, after a one-year absence. The Bison played their home games at William H. Greene Stadium. They were a member of the Mid-Eastern Athletic Conference. They finished the season 5–7, 3–5 in MEAC play to finish in a tie for seventh place.

Schedule

References

Howard
Howard Bison football seasons
Howard Bison football